Akkuzulu is a village in the District of Çubuk, Ankara Province, Turkey.

References

Villages in Çubuk District